Alexander Morrison (January 15, 1851 – January 24, 1930) was a Canadian farmer and politician.

Born in Kemptville, Canada West, the son of William Morrison and Elizabeth Morrow, Morrison attended public school and then became a farmer in Homewood, Manitoba. He was Reeve of the Rural Municipality of Dufferin for six years before being elected to the House of Commons of Canada for Macdonald in a 1912 by-election. After the election was declared void in 1913, he was re-elected in the resulting by-election. A Conservative, he did not run for re-election in 1917. He died in 1930 in Carman, Manitoba.

References

External links
 

1851 births
1930 deaths
Conservative Party of Canada (1867–1942) MPs
Members of the House of Commons of Canada from Manitoba
People from Leeds and Grenville United Counties